Adolf Avraham Berman (17 October 1906 – 3 February 1978) was a Polish-Israeli activist and communist politician.

Biography
Born in Warsaw in the Russian Empire (today in Poland), the younger brother of Jakub Berman. Berman attended the University of Warsaw, where he earned a PhD in psychology. Whilst a student, he joined Poale Zion Left and edited its two newspapers (one in Polish and one in Yiddish).

During World War II he was one of the leaders of the Jewish underground in the Warsaw Ghetto, and a member of the presidium of the Underground National Committee. He also served as general secretary of Żegota, the Polish underground Council for Jewish Aid whose aim was to rescue Jews from the Holocaust, and CENTOS, a children's aid society in the Warsaw ghetto.

After the war ended, he became a representative of the communist-dominated Sejm, and in 1947 became chairman of the Central Committee of Polish Jews. Berman was removed from this position in April 1949 because he was a Zionist.

In 1950, he immigrated to Israel, where he joined Mapam (United Workers Party). Berman was elected to the Second Knesset on the party's list in the 1951 elections, but on 20 February 1952 left the party and formed the Left Faction together with Rostam Bastuni and Moshe Sneh. On 1 November 1954 Berman joined the Communist Party of Israel (Maki), and became a member of its Central Committee. He lost his Knesset seat in the 1955 elections.

In 1961, Berman testified at Adolf Eichmann's trial in Israel. He served as chairman of the Israel's Organization of Anti-Nazi Fighters, and a member of the presidium of the World Organization of Jewish Partisans and former Nazi Prisoners. Berman died in 1978 at the age of 71. His older brother, Jakub Berman – was a leading Stalinist politician in post-war Poland.

References

External links

1906 births
1978 deaths
People from Warsaw Governorate
Members of the State National Council
Members of the Sejm
Polish emigrants to Israel
Jewish socialists
Left Faction politicians
Mapam politicians
Maki (historical political party) politicians
Members of the 2nd Knesset (1951–1955)
Warsaw Ghetto inmates
Jewish resistance members during the Holocaust
Armia Ludowa members
University of Warsaw alumni
Recipients of the Order of the Cross of Grunwald, 2nd class
Polish Zionists
Polish editors
Żegota members
Burials at Nahalat Yitzhak Cemetery
Israeli communists